Suleiman I's campaign of 1529 was launched by the Ottoman Empire to take the Austrian capital Vienna and thereby strike a decisive blow, allowing the Ottomans to consolidate their hold on Hungary. This was in response to Ferdinand I's daring assault on Ottoman Hungary.

March
Suleiman's march to Vienna was also an attempt to assist his vassal, John Szapolyai who claimed the throne of Hungary. Suleiman sent his army of 120,000 strong north on the 10 May 1529 . His campaign was marked by speedy success- on September 8 Buda surrendered to the Ottomans and John Szapolyai was installed as King of Hungary. Suleiman then went further taking Gran, Tata, Komárom and Raab so that much of Ferdinand I's gains the previous two years were lost. On 27 September, Suleiman reached Vienna.

Aftermath
The arrival of the Sultan's massive host in Central Europe caused much panic across Europe - Martin Luther, who had believed that the Turks were God's punishment against the sins of Christians modified his views and wrote the book the War with the Turks in 1529 urging that "the scourge of God" should be fought with great vigour. However, when Suleiman began besieging Vienna it would prove to be his first and most decisive blunder.

Bibliography
 
Madden, Thomas F. Crusades the Illustrated History. 1st ed. Ann Arbor: University of Michigan P, 2005
 Turnbull, Stephen. The Ottoman Empire 1326 - 1699. New York: Osprey, 2003.

Notes

Conflicts in 1529
Military campaigns involving the Holy Roman Empire
Military campaigns involving the Ottoman Empire
1529 in the Habsburg monarchy
1529 in the Ottoman Empire
Wars involving Croatia
Wars involving Moldavia
16th century in the Holy Roman Empire
Ferdinand I, Holy Roman Emperor
Suleiman the Magnificent